George E. Heffner (March 18, 1923 – October 8, 2008) was an American politician from Maryland. He served as a member of the Maryland House of Delegates, representing District 6 from 1973 to 1974 and District 9 from 1975 to 1978.

Early life
George E. Heffner was born on March 18, 1923, in Fullerton, Baltimore County, Maryland. He attended St. Joseph, a parochial school in Baltimore County. He left school to support his family after his father died.

Career
Heffner served in the United States Navy as a mechanic during World War II. He worked as a trial magistrate from 1963 to 1967. He was chief license inspector in Baltimore County from 1967 to 1969 and served as police magistrate in Rosedale, Maryland, from 1969 to 1972. He owned Putty Hill Garage and Towing for a number of years and sold it to his cousin in the 1970s.

Heffner was a Democrat. In 1973, Heffner was appointed as a member of the Maryland House of Delegates, representing District 6, following the resignation of William T. Evans. He represented District 6 until 1974. He represented District 9 in the Maryland House of Delegates from 1975 to 1978.

Heffner was a champion of the Free State Stock Racing Association in 1953, 1954 and 1955.

Personal life
Heffner married Evelyn Ashley. He had one stepson, Carl Wayne DeHaven Jr. Heffner died on October 8, 2008, in Kingsville, Maryland. He was buried at Gardens of Faith Cemetery in Rosedale.

References

1923 births
2008 deaths
People from Baltimore County, Maryland
Democratic Party members of the Maryland House of Delegates
Racing drivers from Maryland
United States Navy personnel of World War II